Damonte is a surname. Notable people with the surname include:

 Israel Damonte (born 1982), Argentine footballer and manager
 Loris Damonte (born 1990), Italian footballer
 Tanner Damonte (born 1997), American League of Legends player